Barneveld is a town in the Dutch province of Gelderland and also the administrative center of the eponymous municipality.

Transport
Barneveld is served by Connexxion at three train stations. Barneveld Centrum is in the centre of Barneveld and the Barneveld Noord railway station in the village of Harselaar, where there is a Park & Ride facility and Barneveld Zuid railway station in the newly constructed area known as Veller

Barneveld is also connected by the A1 and A30 motorways, as well as provincial roads N301, N344, N800, N802, and N805.

Economy
Due to the central geographic location of the city and its close proximity to major transport routes Barneveld has become a foundry for innovative industry. Moba, the world's largest manufacturer of egg grading and packing machines. Baan was a longtime leader in the ERP market before it almost collapsed due to "creative" revenue manipulation. Bettink Service en Onderhoud, which is the biggest brand independent wind turbine service company in the Netherlands. Eltomation, which has been involved in the development and worldwide supply of over 160 complete plants and projects for the production of Cement Bonded Boards. EeStairs, that created a DNA-inspired staircase and designed a space-saving stair solution that fits into a tiny 3-foot-by-3-foot space. Paperfoam, a company that is specialised in environmental friendly packaging with a very low carbon footprint. Other locally well known companies are Vink, De Heus, founded in Barneveld, current HQ in Ede, Netherlands and the Royal BDU Publishing.

Education 
There are 3 secondary schools in Barneveld: 
 
 De Meerwaarde

Notable residents
 Jacobus Cornelius Kapteyn (1851–1922), astronomer
 Eduard Daniel van Oort (1876–1933), ornithologist
 Egbert Adriaan Kreiken (1896–1964), teacher and astronomer
 Jaap Romijn (born 1943), custom furniture maker, illustrator
 Conny van Bentum (born 1965), freestyle swimmer
 Alfred Schreuder (born 1972), footballer and football coach
 Sander van de Streek (born 1993), footballer
 Gert Van Hoef (born 1994), international organist

See also
 De Hoeksteen, Barneveld (church)
 Barnevelder
 Barneveldse Krant
 Camp Barneveld

References

Barneveld (municipality)
Populated places in Gelderland